Edward Dodds may refer to:

 Charles Dodds (Edward Charles Dodds, 1899–1973), British biochemist.
 Edward E. Dodds (1845–1901), Canadian soldier who fought in the American Civil War.
 Edward Dodds (producer) (1898–1962), Canadian cinema producer.